The 2011–12 TCU Horned Frogs basketball team represented Texas Christian University. The team was coached by Jim Christian. They played their home games at Daniel–Meyer Coliseum in Fort Worth, Texas and were a member of the Mountain West Conference. They finished the season 18–15, 7–7 in Mountain West play to finish in fifth place. They lost in the quarterfinals of the Mountain West Basketball tournament to Colorado State. They were invited to the 2012 College Basketball Invitational where they defeated Milwaukee in the first round before falling in the quarterfinals to Oregon State.

This was TCU's last season in Mountain West Conference as they will depart for the Big 12 Conference beginning in 2012–2013 season.

Roster

Schedule and results 

|-
!colspan=9| Exhibition

|-
!colspan=9| Regular season

|-
!colspan=9| 2012 Mountain West Conference men's basketball tournament

|-
!colspan=9| 2012 CBI

References 

TCU
TCU Horned Frogs men's basketball seasons
TCU